The 2018 All-Africa Korfball Championship (AAKC) was held in Chitungwiza, Zimbabwe, from 27 April to 29 April, with 3 national teams in competition.

Summary
The tournament also served as an African qualifier for the 2019 IKF World Korfball Championship, with the top two African nations qualifying for the world championship. However, as the World Championship will be held in South Africa, they qualified automatically as hosts and hence only the top team (besides South Africa) will qualify.

Although open to more participants, only three teams registered for the tournament. Besides the host ,  and  participated. The structure of the tournament features a group stage in which all teams play each other twice, after which ties were broken by the higher number of goals scored in the winning match between the teams in question.

Defending champions South Africa retained their title, although they lose once to Zimbabwe and were tied in points at the end of the group stage. South Africa ranked ahead of Zimbabwe as they scored more goals in their winning match (20 vs 17).

Group stage 
The group stage took place on 27, 28 and 29 April 2018.

|}

References 

All-Africa Korfball Championship
2018 in Zimbabwean sport
2018 in korfball
International sports competitions hosted by Zimbabwe
Chitungwiza
Korfball in Zimbabwe
April 2018 sports events in Africa